Cranfill is a surname. Notable people with the surname include:

 James B. Cranfill (1858–1942), American religious figure and prohibitionist
 Les Cranfill (1899–1983), American football, basketball, and baseball coach
 , botanist